Brice Garnett (born September 6, 1983) is an American professional golfer who has played on the PGA Tour.

After attending Missouri Western State University, where he was a three-time NCAA Division II All-American, Garnett turned pro in 2006. He played on the Adams Pro Tour from 2007 to 2009. From 2010 to 2013, he played on the Web.com Tour. Garnett improved his money list rank each season, culminating with a 14th-place finish in 2013 which earned him a card for the 2014 PGA Tour. During his rookie season on the PGA Tour, he made 20 cuts in 28 events, highlighted by a tie for seventh at the Shell Houston Open. He qualified for the 2014 FedEx Cup Playoffs, one of only two rookies to do so, the other being Chesson Hadley.

In 2016, Garnett finished 177th on the PGA Tour and had to go to qualifying school to earn a place on the Web.com Tour for 2017.  He tied for 19th at Q-school and then won two tournaments in 2017 to finish in first place in the regular season rankings, earning a return to the PGA Tour.

Garnett earned his first PGA Tour win in 2018 at the Corales Puntacana Resort and Club Championship.

Professional wins (6)

PGA Tour wins (1)

Web.com Tour wins (2)

Other wins (3)
2010 Mary Bird Perkins Open (Adams Pro Tour)
2011 River Hills Classic, The Southern Open (eGolf Professional Tour)

Results in major championships 

CUT = missed the half-way cut
"T" = tied

Results in The Players Championship

CUT = missed the halfway cut
"T" indicates a tie for a place
C = Canceled after the first round due to the COVID-19 pandemic

See also
2013 Web.com Tour Finals graduates
2017 Web.com Tour Finals graduates
2022 Korn Ferry Tour Finals graduates

References

External links

American male golfers
PGA Tour golfers
Korn Ferry Tour graduates
Golfers from Missouri
Missouri Western Griffons men's golfers
People from Gallatin, Missouri
1983 births
Living people